Metedeconk may refer to:

 Metedeconk and Metedeconk Neck, villages in Brick Township, New Jersey, U.S.
Metedeconk River, a tributary of Barnegat Bay in New Jersey
North Branch Metedeconk River, a tributary of the above
South Branch Metedeconk River, a tributary of the above